The Elginfield Observatory is an astronomical observatory located in the township of Middlesex Centre, Ontario (Canada), about  north of London, Ontario.  The observatory is owned and operated by the University of Western Ontario, and opened in 1969.  The observatory features a  Ritchey–Chrétien telescope built by Boller and Chivens which is used for spectroscopy and photometry.  The telescope can be configured to feed instruments at the Cassegrain, Nasmyth, and Coudé foci.  Recent research includes monitoring the changing size of Cepheid variable stars, estimating out-gasing of minor planets, and searching for large Perseid meteoroids.

The observatory was closed at the end of 2010.

See also
 David Dunlap Observatory
 List of astronomical observatories

References

External links
 Physics and Astronomy Department at the University of Western Ontario
 Elginfield Observatory Clear Sky Chart Forecasts of observing conditions.

Astronomical observatories in Canada
University of Western Ontario
Buildings and structures in Middlesex County, Ontario